Óláfsdrápa Tryggvasonar (The drápa of Óláfr Tryggvason) is an Icelandic skaldic poem from ca. 1200. It relates the life story of the 10th century King Óláfr Tryggvason from his upbringing in Russia to his death at Svöldr. The poem is only preserved in Bergsbók and the text there is defective. After 16 dróttkvætt verses, there is a lacuna of an estimated 40 verses followed by 12 preserved final verses. The manuscript attributes the poem to Hallfreðr vandræðaskáld, Óláfr's court poet, but this attribution is rejected by modern scholars. The poem has many similarities with Rekstefja, a poem from the same time on the same subject and preserved in the same manuscript.

While by no means an original or historically important poem, the Óláfsdrápa has been praised for its "engaging directness". The unknown author was influenced by earlier 12th-century poets, such as Einarr Skúlason and Þorkell Hamarskáld.

Notes

References
 Eysteinn Björnsson (2002). Index of Old Norse/Icelandic Skaldic Poetry. Published online at: http://www.hi.is/~eybjorn/ugm/skindex/skindex.html See in particular "Óláfs drápa Tryggvasonar" at http://www.hi.is/~eybjorn/ugm/skindex/od.html from the editions of Finnur Jónsson and E. A. Kock.
 Hoops, Johannes (2003). Reallexikon der germanischen Altertumskunde: Band 22. Walter de Gruyter.  
 Vries, Jan de (1999). Altnordische Literaturgeschichte: 3. Auflage. Mit einem Vorwort von Stefanie Wurth. Walter de Gruyter. 

Skaldic poems
Works of unknown authorship